Geert Emmerechts (Vilvoorde, 5 May 1968) is a former Belgian footballer who played as central defender.

Honours 
Royal Antwerp

 Belgian Cup: 1991-92
 UEFA Cup Winners' Cup: 1992-93 (runners-up)

References

External links
 
 

1968 births
Living people
Belgian footballers
Belgium international footballers
Association football defenders
R.W.D. Molenbeek players
Royal Antwerp F.C. players
K.S.V. Roeselare players
Belgian Pro League players
Challenger Pro League players
Belgian football managers
People from Vilvoorde
Footballers from Flemish Brabant